Shieldaig is a village in Wester Ross in the Northwest Highlands and is in the Scottish council area of Highland.

Geography and history
The village was founded in 1800 with a view to training up seamen for war against Napoleon. After his (initial) defeat and exile to Elba, the community found itself a new role as a fishing village. The small island just offshore never had its tall pines harvested to rig warships, and has now become a nature sanctuary.

The name of the village is derived from the Old Norse síld-vík, meaning 'herring bay'.

Shieldaig is a community of around 85 people, with its own school, a small pub, a village hall, a church and two restaurants. It is much used as a holiday destination, attracting those interested in fishing, touring the North Coast 500 or explorers of the Torridon Hills, which are a few miles around the coast.

Shieldaig holds a community fete in the second weekend of August.

Another Shieldaig
 to the north lies another Shieldaig.

See also
Shieling

References

External links

Populated places in Ross and Cromarty
Torridon